The 2021–22 Colorado College Tigers men's ice hockey season was the 82nd season of play for the program and the 9th in the NCHC conference. The Tigers represented Colorado College and were coached by Kris Mayotte, in his 1st season.

Season
Colorado College enters the 2021–22 season with both a new head coach and a new home arena, with the on-campus Ed Robson Arena officially opening with an exhibition game against local rival Air Force on October 2, 2021. The season turned out to be effectively a rebuilding year for the program with the team's offense being substandard for most of the campaign. While the defense wasn't much better, sophomore Dominic Basse kept the Tigers in many games early in the season. Despite some goaltending heroics, CC's pop-gun offense provided the team with just 2 wins in their first 13 games.

While the team was never fully able to get on track, Colorado College managed to stay out of the NCHC basement on the strength of a season sweep of Miami. The four wins against the RedHawks made up almost half of the Tiger's total for the year.

As the campaign progressed, Basse's play in net became inconsistent and he ended up splitting time with Matt Vernon. By the end of the season, Vernon had taken control of the starting role and was in goal for the team's two playoff games. While CC lost both matches, Vernon acquitted himself well by surrendering just 2 goals in each game to North Dakota.

Departures

Recruiting

Roster
As of August 12, 2021.

Standings

Schedule and results

|-
!colspan=12 style=";" | Exhibition

|-
!colspan=12 style=";" | Regular Season

|-
!colspan=12 style=";" | 

|- align="center" bgcolor="#e0e0e0"
|colspan=12|Colorado College Lost Series 0–2

Scoring Statistics

Goaltending statistics

Rankings

Note: USCHO did not release a poll in week 24.

References

2021-22
Colorado College Tigers
Colorado College Tigers
Colorado College Tigers
Colorado College Tigers